This is a list of members of the European Parliament serving in the sixth term (2004–2009). It is sorted by an English perception of surname treating all variations of de/di/do, van/von, Ó, and so forth as part of the collation key, even if this is not the normal practice in a member's own country.

This list was initially published by the Parliament at the convening on 20 July 2004, amended on 21 July when the Lega Nord affiliated to the Independence and Democracy group, and then further updated with replacements. Members from Bulgaria and Romania, appointed by their parliaments, became full members on 1 January 2007; some of these participated in the formation of the new Identity, Tradition, Sovereignty group in the following sitting of the Parliament, but this broke up later the same year.


List

Outgoing members during the session

Sources
EU elections site
French Ministry of the Interior
Italian Ministry of the Interior
rai.it & Uniti nell'ulivo
Polish Official Results
slovensko.com
European Parliament – Your MEPs

See also
Members of the European Parliament 2004–2009
2004 European Parliament election

List